Red Heat is a 1988 American buddy cop action film directed, co-written, and co-produced by Walter Hill and starring Arnold Schwarzenegger as Soviet policeman Ivan Danko, and Jim Belushi as Chicago police detective Art Ridzik. Finding themselves on the same case, Danko and Ridzik work as partners to catch a cunning and deadly Georgian drug kingpin, Viktor Rostavili (Ed O'Ross), who killed Danko's previous partner. Most of the scenes set in the Soviet Union were actually shot in Hungary. Schwarzenegger was paid a salary of $8 million for his role in the film.

Plot
Captain Ivan Danko and Lieutenant Yuri Ogarkov of the Moscow Militsiya lead a sting operation against Georgian drug kingpin Viktor Rostavili. However, Rostavili manages to evade capture, and in an ensuing firefight, kills Ogarkov and flees to the United States. As Danko is recovering from his injuries, Rostavili is arrested for a minor traffic violation in Chicago, and Danko is subsequently dispatched to America to retrieve the felon, under strict orders not to reveal the true nature of Rostavili's extradition.

Upon arriving in Chicago, Danko is met by Police Detective Sergeant Art Ridzik and Detective Max Gallagher. As he is interrogating Rostavili, Danko confiscates a mysterious key hidden on his person. While he is being transported to the airport, the group is ambushed by his men and Gallagher is shot and killed, allowing the prisoner to escape. Against the wishes of local authorities, Danko resolves to remain in Chicago to apprehend Rostavili, and Ridzik is assigned to be his minder.

Through an informant, Danko and Ridzik learn that Rostavili is working with local street gangs to purchase and smuggle uncut cocaine into the Soviet Union. The duo confront Rostavili's American wife Cat Manzetti, but are led into an ambush where Rostavili demands Danko return his key, forcing the two to flee.

Danko and Ridzik go to a hospital to interrogate one of Rostavili's men, injured during the earlier ambush, but he is killed by another of Rostavili's accomplices disguised as a nurse. Danko subsequently shoots and kills the assassin. Ridzik's superiors confiscate Danko's sidearm, as he is not licensed to carry one in the United States, and order him to cease the investigation. However Ridzik, who still wants to avenge his partner's murder, secretly gives Ivan his spare gun. Cat is then murdered by Rostavili.

Returning to his hotel, Danko is attacked by Rostavili's men. While Danko fights them off, Rostavili sneaks into his room and steals the key. Ridzik takes Danko to visit a locksmith, where they match the key to ones produced for lockers at a bus terminal. Rostavili uses the key to retrieve his drug shipment, and steals an empty bus just as Danko and Ridzik arrive. Chasing him in another bus, Danko and Ridzik cause Rostavili to crash into an oncoming train. As Rostavili crawls out of the wreckage, Danko kills him. Later, Ridzik takes Danko to the airport. As a token of their new friendship, they exchange wristwatches.

Cast

 Arnold Schwarzenegger as Captain Ivan Danko
 James Belushi as Detective Sergeant Art Ridzik
 Peter Boyle as Commander Lou Donnelly
 Ed O'Ross as Viktor Rostavili / Viktor Rosta
 Larry Fishburne as Lieutenant Charlie Stobbs
 Gina Gershon as Catherine "Cat" Manzetti
 Richard Bright as Sergeant Max Gallagher
 J. W. Smith as Salim
 Brent Jennings as Abdul Elijah
 Gretchen Palmer as Hooker
 Pruitt Taylor Vince as Night Clerk
 Michael Hagerty as Pat Nunn
 Brion James as "Streak"
 Gloria Delaney as Intern
 Peter Jason as TV announcer
 Oleg Vidov as Yuri Ogarkov
 Savely Kramarov as Gregor Moussorsky

Production

Development and writing
The film was based on an original story by Walter Hill. He says he conceived of the idea for Red Heat because he and Arnold Schwarzenegger had long wanted to work together:
I didn't want to do sci-fi and it's tough to use Arnold credibly in an American context with his accent. I thought it would be interesting if he could play a Russian cop in the US. I wanted to do a traditional John Wayne/Clint Eastwood larger-than-life movie. You then ask the question: Will the American audience accept an unapologetic Soviet hero, someone who will not defect at the end of the movie?
According to Schwarzenegger, when Hill approached him he did not have a complete script – he just had the basic premise and the scene in which Danko rips off a henchman's leg to discover it is wooden and contains cocaine. Schwarzenegger agreed to make the movie on the basis of this and Hill's track record, in particular his earlier buddy action comedy 48 Hours.

The wooden leg scene originally came from a script by Harry Kleiner that had been sent to Hill. Hill did not want to do the script but loved the scene and paid Kleiner for it. "I think it's the best scene in the movie", said Hill later. "The movie, after he left Moscow, I never thought was much good, but I thought that was a terrific scene."

Hill says he deliberately chose to tone down the Schwarzenegger persona, making him more realistic and less prone to wisecracks. Hill:
I had confidence in him as an actor. I didn't want him just to throw a Volkswagen over a building. Arnold has an ability to communicate that cuts through cultures and countries. They just love to see this guy win. But everyone thinks it's his muscles. It's not that at all: it's his face, his eyes. He has a face that's a throwback to a warrior from the Middle Ages or ancient Greece.
Schwarzenegger says Hill told him to watch Greta Garbo's performance in Ninotchka (1939) "to get a handle on how Danko [his character] should react as a loyal Soviet in the West. I got to learn a little Russian, and it was a role for which my own accent was a plus."

The music score was done by James Horner. "I told James I wanted something like you're in the Olympics and you've just won a gold medal", said Hill. "I wanted something heroic." The second movement ("Philosophers") of Sergei Prokofiev's Cantata for the 20th Anniversary of the October Revolution was used in the opening and closing titles of the film.

Hill says he wanted to use buses rather than cars in the climactic action scene because it would be more interesting. "Also, I thought it was very appropriate for Arnold. He doesn't fit well in cars."

He described the film as "in an odd way, it's a traditional love story between these two guys".

The script was constantly rewritten during the shoot. Among the writers who worked on it were Hill himself, Harry Kleiner, Troy Kennedy Martin, Steven Meerson & Peter Krikes, and John Mankiewicz & Daniel Pyne. "You've got to understand that Walter likes to create as he goes along", said a source close to the production. "Also, the project was put together quickly based on an idea of his-a Russian cop in Chicago. There was no script." A spokesman for the Writers Guild said Hill was a member in very good standing: "He does tend to hire a lot of people but he pays well above minimums and we feel he's been quite straightforward about screen credit."

Film title designer Wayne Fitzgerald created a new font for the film, a morph of English and Russian alphabets. For example, he removed the bar in "A" so that it imitates the Russian Л (Λ), and flipped letters N and R, so that they coincide with Russian И and Я, respectively.

Filming
The first half of the opening scene was shot in Budapest's Rudas Thermal Bath. It features a brawl between naked men, including Schwarzenegger. He approved the scene saying that "Whenever the scene calls for nudity and it fits into the movie, I don't mind that .. But if it is exploiting the whole idea and is thrown in for no reason, then it bothers me and I stay away from it."

The second half was shot in Austria because Budapest had no snow. The film shot in Moscow for four days, primarily at Red Square, which became possible due to the rapid warm up of the cultural and political relations between the Soviet Union and United States. Despite obtaining permission to film in Moscow, the film crew was unsure about exactly where they could shoot; hence many "Moscow" scenes were eventually filmed in Budapest. For example, Buda Castle was used as the Soviet Ministry of home affairs.

Weapons
In the film, Danko is using "the best Soviet gun of 9.2 mm caliber designed by Podbyrin". Hill wanted it to be an unusually large and threatening weapon resembling Walther P38. Tim LaFrance designed the gun at his workshop in San Diego, starting from Desert Eagle as an inspiration; hence the gun was nicknamed the "Hollywood Eagle". After release of the movie, its copies were sold in the United States as "Pobyrin pistol".<ref>Smith, Matt (August 2002) Interview with Tim LaFrance of LaFrance Specialties. Small Arms Review, Vol. 5(11)</ref>

As to the weapon of the main villain, Viktor Rostavili, Hill wanted it to be a concealed, mafia-style gun. LaFrance designed it as a modified derringer, which was strapped to a forearm using a spring-based system. The gun was hidden in a sleeve, and slid into the hand after a certain hand movement.

Release
TheatricalRed Heat opened in Los Angeles and New York on June 17, 1988. It was distributed by TriStar Pictures. 

Reception
Box office
The film opened at the top spot at the box office, it grossed $35 million in the US,  but was far outpaced by Schwarzenegger's other comedy film in 1988, Twins.

Schwarzenegger later wrote the film "wasn't the smash I'd expected. Why is hard to guess. It could be that audiences were not ready for Russia, or that my and Jim Belushi's performances were not funny enough, or that the director didn't do a good enough job. For whatever reason, it just didn't quite close the deal."

Walter Hill said the film "did pretty well at the domestic box office but not as well as what we hoped it would do. It was big foreign. It was a very big seller on cassette. Did the movie do poorly, medium or well?"

Critical response
On Rotten Tomatoes the film has an approval rating of 68% based on reviews from 25 critics, with an average rating of 5.5/10. The site's consensus states: "Red Heat's overreliance on genre formula is bolstered by Walter Hill's rugged direction and a strong touch of humor." On Metacritic the film has a score of 61% based on reviews from 13 critics, indicating "generally favorable reviews". Audiences polled by CinemaScore gave the film an average grade of "B" on an A+ to F scale.

Roger Ebert of the Chicago Sun-Times gave it 3 out of 4, and wrote: "The film is punctuated by violence, a great deal of violence, although most of it is exaggerated comic-book style instead of being truly gruesome. Walking that fine line is a speciality of Hill." Variety gave it a positive review, stating "Schwarzenegger [...] is right on target with his characterization of the iron-willed soldier, and Belushi proves a quicksilver foil.

Hal Hinson of The Washington Post panned the film: "Red Heat'' is poorly, or even indifferently, made. It's a joyless exercise, and too much angry resignation seeps in for it to be very funny or very entertaining." Film historian Leonard Maltin seemed to agree with Hinson, calling the film "...cheerless and foul-mouthed, with two of the least-appealing characters imaginable as the good guys."

Other media

Video game

A video game based on the film was released in 1989, for various computer platforms.

References

External links

 
 
 

1988 films
1988 action thriller films
1988 action comedy films
1980s comedy thriller films
1980s buddy cop films
American action thriller films
American action comedy films
American comedy thriller films
American buddy cop films
American buddy action films
American police detective films
Carolco Pictures films
Cold War films
Cold War in popular culture
Fictional portrayals of the Chicago Police Department
Films scored by James Horner
Films about the Russian Mafia
Films about drugs
Films directed by Walter Hill
Films produced by Gordon Carroll
Films produced by Walter Hill
Films set in Budapest
Films set in Chicago
Films set in Moscow
Films set in the Soviet Union
Films shot in Austria
Films shot in Budapest
Films shot in Moscow
Films shot in Chicago
Films with screenplays by Walter Hill
Films with screenplays by Troy Kennedy Martin
Films with screenplays by Harry Kleiner
1980s Russian-language films
TriStar Pictures films
1980s English-language films
1988 multilingual films
American multilingual films
1980s American films